The Air Mail scandal, also known as the Air Mail fiasco, is the name that the American press gave to the political scandal resulting from a 1934 congressional investigation of the awarding of contracts to certain airlines to carry airmail and the subsequent disastrous use of the U.S. Army Air Corps to fly the mail after the contracts were revoked.

During the administration of President Herbert Hoover, Congress passed the Air Mail Act of 1930. Using its provisions, Postmaster General Walter Folger Brown held a meeting with the executives of the top airlines, later dubbed the "Spoils Conference", in which the airlines effectively divided among themselves the air mail routes. Acting on those agreements, Brown awarded contracts to the participants through a process that effectively prevented smaller carriers from bidding, resulting in a Senate investigation.

The Senate investigation resulted in a citation of Contempt of Congress on February 5, 1934 against attorney William P. MacCracken Jr. who helped draft the law while working for the government and brokered the meeting of the airlines. It was the only action taken against any former Hoover administration official for the scandal. Two days later Roosevelt cancelled all existing air mail contracts with the airlines and ordered the Air Corps to deliver the mail until new contracts could be awarded. The Air Corps was ill-prepared to conduct a mail operation, particularly at night, and from its outset on February 19 encountered severe winter weather. The Army Air Corps Mail Operation suffered numerous crashes and the deaths of 13 airmen, causing severe public criticism of the Roosevelt Administration.

Temporary contracts were put into effect on May 8 by the new postmaster general, James A. Farley, in a manner nearly identical to that of the "Spoils Conference" that started the scandal. Service was completely restored to the airlines by June 1, 1934. On June 12, Congress passed the Air Mail Act of 1934 cancelling the provisions of the 1930 law and enacting punitive measures against executives who were a part of the Spoils Conferences. Although a public relations nightmare for the administrations of both presidents, the scandal resulted in the restructuring of the airline industry, leading to technological improvements and a new emphasis on passenger operations, and the modernization of the Air Corps.

Roots of the scandal

Development of air mail

The first scheduled airmail service in the United States was conducted during World War I by the Air Service of the United States Army between May 15 and August 10, 1918, a daily run between Washington, D.C., and New York City with an intermediate stop in Philadelphia, Pennsylvania. The operation was put together in ten days by Major Reuben H. Fleet, the executive officer for flying training of the Division of Military Aeronautics, and managed by Captain Benjamin B. Lipsner, a non-flyer. Starting with six converted Curtiss JN-4HM "Jennies", two of which were destroyed in crashes, and later using Curtiss R-4LMs, in 76 days of operations Air Service pilots moved 20 tons of mail without a single fatality or serious injury, achieving a 74% completion rate of flights during the summer thunderstorm season.

Air mail operations by the U.S. Post Office began in August 1918 under Lipsner, who resigned from the Army on July 13 to take the post. Lipsner procured Standard JR-1B biplanes specially modified to carry the mail with twice the range of the military mailplanes, the first civil aircraft built to U.S. government specifications. For nine years, using mostly war-surplus de Havilland DH.4 biplanes, the Post Office built and flew a nationwide network. In the beginning the work was extremely dangerous; of the initial 40 pilots, three died in crashes in 1919 and nine more in 1920. It was 1922 before an entire year ensued without a fatal crash.

As safety and capability grew, daytime-only operations gave way to flying at night, assisted by airway beacons and lighted emergency landing fields. Regular transcontinental air mail delivery began in 1924. In 1925, to encourage commercial aviation, the Kelly Act (also known as the Air Mail Act of 1925) authorized the Post Office Department to contract with private airlines for feeder routes into the main transcontinental system. The first commercial air mail flight was on the  route CAM (Contract Air Mail) No. 5 from Pasco, Washington, to Elko, Nevada, on April 6, 1926. By 1927 the transition had been completed to entirely commercial transport of mail, and by 1929 45 airlines were involved in mail delivery at a cost per mile of $1.10. Most were small, under-capitalized companies flying short routes and old equipment.

Subsidies for carrying mail exceeded the cost of the mail itself, and some carriers abused their contracts by flooding the system with junk mail at 100% profit or hauling heavy freight as air mail. Historian Oliver E. Allen, in his book The Airline Builders, estimated that airlines would have had to charge a 150-pound passenger $450 per ticket (equal to $ in  dollars) in lieu of carrying an equivalent amount of mail.

William P. MacCracken Jr.

William P. MacCracken Jr. became the first federal regulator of commercial aviation when then-Secretary of Commerce Herbert Hoover named him the first Assistant Secretary of Commerce for Aeronautics in 1926. During World War I he had served as a flight instructor, had served on the Chicago Aeronautical Commission, and was a member of the board of governors of the National Aeronautical Association when selected by Hoover.

MacCracken left the Commerce Department in 1929 and returned to his private law practice, where he continued to be involved in the growth of commercial aviation by representing many major airlines.

Postmaster General Walter Folger Brown sought to improve the efficiency of the air mail carriers in furtherance of a national transportation plan. Requiring an informed intermediary, Brown asked MacCracken to preside over what was later scandalized as the Spoils Conferences, to work out an agreement between the carriers and the Post office to consolidate air mail routes into transcontinental networks operated by the best-equipped and financially stable companies. This relationship left both exposed to charges of favoritism. When MacCracken refused later to testify before the Senate, he was found in contempt of Congress.

Air Mail Act of 1930

Hoover appointed Brown as postmaster general in 1929. In 1930, with the nation's airlines apparently headed for extinction in the face of a severe economic downturn and citing inefficient, expensive subsidized air mail delivery, Brown requested supplementary legislation to the 1925 act granting him authority to change postal policy.  The Air Mail Act of 1930, passed on April 29 and known as the McNary-Watres Act after its chief sponsors, Sen. Charles L. McNary of Oregon and Rep. Laurence H. Watres of Pennsylvania, authorized the postmaster general to enter into longer-term airmail contracts with rates based on space or volume, rather than weight. The Act gave Brown strong authority (some argued almost dictatorial powers) over the nationwide air transportation system.

The main provision of the Air Mail Act changed the manner in which payments were calculated. Air mail carriers would be paid for having sufficient cargo capacity on their planes, whether the planes carried mail or flew empty, a disincentive to carry mail since the carrier received a set fee for a plane of a certain size whether or not it carried mail. The purpose of the provision was to discourage the carrying of bulk junk mail to boost profits, particularly by the smaller and inefficient carriers, and to encourage the carrying of passengers. Airlines using larger planes designed to carry passengers would increase their revenues by carrying more passengers and less mail. Awards would be made to the “lowest responsible bidder” that had owned an airline operated on a daily schedule of at least 250 miles (402 kilometers) for at least six months.

A second provision allowed any airmail carrier with an existing contract of at least two years standing to exchange its contract for a “route certificate” giving it the right to haul mail for 10 additional years. The third and most controversial provision gave Brown authority to "extend or consolidate" routes in effect according to his own judgment.

Within days of its passage, United Aircraft and Transport Company (UATC) acquired the controlling interest of National Air Transport after a brisk but brief struggle between UATC and Clement M. Keys of NAT. The merger, begun in February 1930 to plug the only gap in UATC's cross-country network of airlines, had been amicable until three weeks before its finalization, when Keys reversed his initial approval. Ironically Brown was angered by the negotiations, worried that the specter of a potential monopoly would endanger the imminent passage of the Air Mail Act. The merger swiftly created the first transcontinental airline.

On May 19, three weeks after the passage of McNary-Watres, at the first of the "Spoils Conferences", Brown invoked his authority under the third provision to consolidate the air mail routes to only three major companies independently competing with each other, with the goal of forcing the plethora of small, inefficient carriers to merge with the larger. Further meetings between the larger carriers, presided over by McCracken, continued into June that often developed into harsh wrangling over route distribution proposals and consequent animosity towards Brown.

After what was described as a "shotgun marriage" between Transcontinental Air Transport and Western Air Express in July to achieve the second of the three companies (UATC was the first), competitive bids were solicited by the Post Office on August 2, 1930, and opened August 25. A surprise competitive bidding struggle ensued between UATC, through a quickly formed skeleton company it called "United Aviation," and the newly merged Transcontinental and Western Air over the central transcontinental route. After initial rejection of the Postmaster General's decision, final approval of the contract award to T&WA was approved by Comptroller General of the United States John R. McCarl on January 10, 1931, on the basis that United's puppet concern was not a "responsible bidder" by the definition of McNary-Watres, in effect validating Brown's restructuring.

These three carriers later evolved into United Airlines (the northern airmail route, CAMs 17 and 18), Trans World Airlines (the mid-United States route, CAM 34) and American Airlines (the southern route, CAM 33). Brown also extended the southern route to the West Coast. He awarded bonuses for carrying more passengers and purchasing multi-engined aircraft equipped with radios and navigation aids. By the end of 1932, the airline industry was the one sector of the economy experiencing steady growth and profitability, described by one historian as "Depression-proof." Passenger miles, the numbers of passengers, and new airline employees had all tripled over 1929. Airmail itself, despite its image to many Americans as a frivolous luxury for the few remaining affluent, had doubled following restructuring. Much of this if not all was the result of the postal subsidies, funded by taxpayers.

Congressional investigation

The air mail scandal began when an officer of the New York Philadelphia and Washington Airway Corporation, known as the Ludington Airline, was having a drink with friend and Hearst newspaper reporter Fulton Lewis Jr. Ludington Airline, established and owned by brothers Townsend and Nicholas Ludington, began offering an hourly daytime passenger shuttle on September 1, 1930, just two weeks after Eastern Air Transport (EAT) began its first passenger operations between New York City and Richmond, Virginia. Using seven Stinson SM-6000B tri-motors, Ludington Airline became the first U. S. airline in history to make a profit carrying nothing but passengers. However it began operating in the red when the novelty of cheap air travel wore off as the Great Depression deepened and competition with arch-rival EAT intensified. The Ludington officer mentioned to Lewis that in 1931 the carrier could not get a proposed "express service" air mail contract to extend CAM 25 (Miami to Washington via Atlanta) to Newark, New Jersey, not even by submitting a low bid of 25 cents a mile. Ludington's general manager, former Air Service aviator Eugene L. Vidal, eager to curtail Ludington's growing losses with a lucrative mail subsidy, had offered the extremely low bid to Brown in order to demonstrate Ludington's commitment to the route extension plan "at or below cost."

Lewis did not think much about the conversation until he later read the Post Office Department's announcement that had awarded Ludington's arch-rival the CAM 25 air mail route contract at 89 cents a mile as measured against Ludington's extremely low bid. By February 1933 Ludington was virtually bankrupt and sold out to EAT for a "bottom basement price of $260,000." Lewis sensed there was a story to be written. He brought the story to the attention of William Randolph Hearst and, although Hearst would not print it, was given approval to investigate the story full-time.

Lewis' investigation began to develop into an air mail contract scandal. Lewis was having difficulty impressing his findings on government officials until he approached Alabama Senator Hugo Black. Black was the chairman of a special committee established to investigate ocean mail contracts awarded by the federal government to the merchant marine. Interstate Commerce Commission investigators seized records from all the mail carriers on September 28, 1933, and brought about public awareness of what became known as "the Black Committee".  The special Senate committee investigated alleged improprieties and gaming of the rate structure, such as carriers padlocking individual pieces of mail to increase weight. Despite showing that Brown's administration of the air mail had increased the efficiency of the service and lowered its costs from $1.10 to $0.54 per mile, and the obvious partisan politics involved in investigating what appeared to be a Republican scandal involving Herbert Hoover by a Democratic-controlled committee, the hearings raised serious questions regarding its legality and ethics.

Black announced that he had found evidence of "fraud and collusion" between the Hoover Administration and the airlines and held public hearings in January 1934, although these allegations were later found to be without basis. Near the end of the hearings on the last day of January, MacCracken was subpoenaed to testify duces tecum "instanter" and appeared, but refused to produce files, citing attorney-client privilege unless the clients waived the privilege (which all did within a week of his appearance). However, the next day MacCracken's law partner gave Northwest Airways vice president Lewis H. Brittin permission to go into MacCracken's files to remove a memo that Brittin claimed was personal and unrelated to the investigation. Brittin later tore up the memo and discarded it. Black charged MacCracken with Contempt of Congress on February 5 and ordered him arrested. During a five-day trial the Senate deemed him a lobbyist not protected by lawyer-client privilege and voted to convict him.

Disregarding as Black did the fact that all but two of the existing contracts (the controversial transcontinental mail routes CAM 33 and CAM 34) had been awarded to the low bidder by Postmaster General Harry S. New during the Coolidge Administration, on February 7, 1934, Roosevelt's postmaster general, James A. Farley, announced that he and President Roosevelt were committed to protecting the public interest and that as a result of the investigation, President Roosevelt had ordered the cancellation of all domestic air mail contracts. However, not stated to the public was that the decision had overridden Farley's recommendation that it be delayed until June 1, by which time new bids could have been received and processed for continued civilian mail transport.

Use of the Army Air Corps

Executive Order 6591

Without consulting either Army Chief of Staff Douglas MacArthur or Chief of the Air Corps Major General Benjamin Foulois, Secretary of War George H. Dern at a cabinet meeting on the morning of February 9, 1934, assured President Roosevelt that the Air Corps could deliver the mail. That same morning, shortly after conclusion of the cabinet meeting, second assistant postmaster general Harllee Branch called Foulois to his office. A conference between members of the Air Corps, the Post Office, and the Aeronautics Branch of the Commerce Department ensued in which Foulois, asked if the Air Corps could deliver the mail in winter, casually assured Branch that the Air Corps could be ready in a week or ten days.

At 4 o'clock that afternoon President Roosevelt suspended the airmail contracts effective at midnight February 19. He issued Executive Order 6591 ordering the War Department to place at the disposal of the Postmaster General "such air airplanes, landing fields, pilots and other employees and equipment of the Army of the United States needed or required for the transportation of mail during the present emergency, by air over routes and schedules prescribed by the Postmaster General."

Preparation and plans
In 1933 the airlines carried several million pounds of mail on 26 routes covering almost  of airways. Transported mostly by night, the mail was carried in modern passenger planes equipped with modern flight instruments and radios, using ground-based beam transmitters as navigation aids. The airlines had a well-established system of maintenance facilities along their routes.

On February 14, five days before the Air Corps was to begin, General Foulois appeared before the House of Representatives Post Office Committee outlining the steps taken by the Air Corps in preparation. In his testimony he assured the committee that the Air Corps had selected its most experienced pilots and that it had the requisite experience at flying at night and in bad weather.

In actuality, of the 262 pilots eventually used, 140 were Reserve junior officers with less than two years flying experience. Most were second lieutenants and only one held a rank higher than first lieutenant. The Air Corps had made a decision not to draw from its training schools, where most of its experienced pilots were assigned. Only 48 of those selected had logged at least 25 hours of flight time in bad weather, only 31 had 50 hours or more of night flying, and only 2 had 50 hours of instrument time.

The Air Corps during the Great Depression, hampered by pay cuts and a reduction of flight time, operated almost entirely in daylight and good weather. Duty hours were limited and relaxed, usually with four hours or less of flight operations a day, and none on weekends. Experience levels were also limited by obsolete aircraft, most of them single-engine and open cockpit planes. Because of a high turnover-rate policy in the War Department, most pilots were Reserve officers who were unfamiliar with the civilian airmail routes.

Regarding equipment, the Air Corps had in its inventory 274 Directional gyros and 460 Artificial horizons, but very few of these were mounted in aircraft. Foulois eventually ordered the available equipment to be installed in the 122 aircraft assigned to the task, but the instruments were not readily available and Air Corps mechanics unfamiliar with the equipment sometimes installed them incorrectly or without regard for standardization of cockpit layout.

The project, termed AACMO (Army Air Corps Mail Operation), was placed under the supervision of Brigadier General Oscar Westover, assistant chief of the Air Corps. He created three geographic zones and appointed Lieutenant Colonel Henry H. Arnold to command the Western Zone, Lieutenant Colonel Horace M. Hickam the Central Zone, and Major Byron Q. Jones the Eastern Zone. Personnel and planes were immediately deployed, but problems began immediately with a lack of proper facilities (and in some instances, no facilities at all) for maintenance of aircraft and quartering of enlisted men, and a failure of tools to arrive where needed.

Sixty Air Corps pilots took oaths as postal employees in preparation for the service and began training. On February 16, three pilots on familiarization flights were killed in crashes attributed to bad weather. This presaged some of the worst and most persistent late winter weather in history.

Further attention was drawn to the startup when the airlines delivered a "parting shot" in the form of a publicity stunt to remind the public of its efficiency in mail service. World War I legend Eddie Rickenbacker, a vice president of North American Aviation (Eastern Air Transport's parent holding company) and Jack Frye of Transcontinental and Western Air, both of which had lost their mail contracts, flew T&WA's prototype Douglas DC-1 airliner "City of Los Angeles," which was still in flight test, across the country on the last evening before the Air Corps operation began. Carrying a partial load of mail and a passenger list of airlines officials and news reporters, they flew from Douglas Aviation's plant at Burbank, California, to Newark, New Jersey. Bypassing several regular stops to stay ahead of a blizzard, the stunt established a new cross-country time record of just over 13 hours, breaking the old record by more than five hours. The DC-1 arrived on the morning of February 19 only two hours before the Air Corps was forced by the winter weather to cancel the startup of AACMO.

AACMO

Blizzard conditions

On February 19, the blizzard disrupted the initial day's operations east of the Rocky Mountains, where the scheduled first flight of the operation from Newark was cancelled. AACMO's actual first effort left from Kansas City, Missouri, carrying 39 pounds of mail to St. Louis. Kenneth Werrell noted of the first flight out of Cleveland: "The pilot on the first air mail flight needed three tries and three aircraft to get aloft. Ten minutes later, he returned with a failed gyro compass and cockpit lights, and obtained a flashlight to read the instruments." Snow, rain, fog, and turbulent winds hampered flying operations for the remainder of the month over much of the United States. The route from Cleveland to Newark over the Allegheny Mountains was dubbed "Hell's Stretch" by airmail pilots.

In the Western Zone, Arnold established his headquarters in Salt Lake City. In the winter of 1932–1933, he and many of his pilots had gained winter flying experience flying food-drop missions to aid Indian reservation settlements throughout the American Southwest isolated by blizzards. As a result of this experience and direct supervision, Arnold's zone was the only one in which a pilot was not killed.

The Western Zone's first flights were made using 18 Boeing P-12 fighters, but these could carry a maximum of only 50 pounds of mail each, and even that amount made them tail-heavy. After one week they were replaced by Douglas O-38 variants including the Douglas O-35 and its bomber version, the B-7, and Douglas O-25C observation biplanes borrowed from the National Guard. In both the Western and Eastern zones, these became the aircraft of choice, modified to carry 160 pounds of mail in their rear cockpits, and in their nose (bombardier/navigator) compartments where those existed. Better-suited planes such as the new Martin YB-10 bomber and Curtiss A-12 Shrike ground attack aircraft were in insufficient numbers to be of practical use. Two YB-10s crashlanded when pilots forgot to lower its retractable landing gear, and there were only enough A-12s for a partial squadron in the Central Zone.

On February 22 a young pilot departing Chicago in an O-39 flew into a snow storm over Deshler, Ohio, and became lost after his navigational radio failed. Fifty miles off course, he bailed out but his parachute caught on the tail section of his airplane and he was killed. That same day in Denison, Texas, another pilot attempting a forced landing was killed when his P-26A flipped over on soft turf. The next day, a Douglas C-29 Dolphin took off from Floyd Bennett Field, New York on a flight to Langley Field to ferry a mail aircraft and ditched when both engines failed a mile off of Rockaway Beach. Waiting for a rescue attempt in heavy seas, the passenger on the amphibian drowned.

President Roosevelt, publicly embarrassed, ordered a meeting with Foulois that resulted in a reduction of routes and schedules (which were already only 60% of that flown by the airlines), and strict flight safety rules. Among the new rules were restrictions on night flying: forbidding pilots with less than two years' experience from being scheduled except under clear conditions, prohibiting takeoffs in inclement weather, and requiring fully functional instruments and radio to continue on in poor conditions. Control officers on the ground were made responsible for enforcement of the restrictions in their areas.

Suspension of the operation

On March 8 and 9, 1934, four more pilots died in crashes, totaling ten fatalities in less than one million miles of flying the mail. (Ironically, the crash of an American Airlines airliner on March 9, also killing four, went virtually unnoticed in the press.) Rickenbacker was quoted as calling the program "legalized murder", which became a catchphrase for criticism of the Roosevelt administration's handling of the crisis. Aviation icon and former air mail pilot Charles A. Lindbergh stated in a telegram to Secretary of War Dern that using the Air Corps to carry mail was "unwarranted and contrary to American principles." Even though both had close ties to the airline industry, their criticisms seriously stung the Roosevelt Administration.

On March 10, President Roosevelt called Foulois and Army Chief of Staff General Douglas MacArthur to the White House, asking them to fly only in completely safe conditions. Foulois replied that to ensure complete safety the Air Corps would have to end the flights, and Roosevelt suspended airmail service on March 11, 1934. Foulois wrote in his autobiography that he and MacArthur incurred "the worst tongue-lashing I ever received in all my military service". Norman E. Borden, in Air Mail Emergency of 1934, wrote: "To lessen the attacks on Roosevelt and Farley, Democratic leaders in both houses of Congress and Post Office officials placed the blame for all that had gone wrong on the shoulders of Foulois." Other supporters of the president outside of the government muted criticism of the administration by focusing on and excoriating Lindbergh, who had also made headlines by publicly protesting the cancellation of the contracts two days after they were announced, "as if his telegram had caused the deaths."

Despite an 11th fatality from a training crash in Wyoming on March 17, the Army resumed the program again on March 19, 1934, in better weather, using only nine routes, limited schedules, and hurried improvements in instrument flying. The O-38E, which had been involved in two fatal accidents at Cheyenne, Wyoming, was withdrawn completely from the operation despite its enclosed cockpit because of its propensity to go into an unrecoverable spin in the mountainous terrain. In early April the Air Corps removed all pilots with less than two years' experience from the operation.

The Air Corps began drawing down AACMO on May 8, 1934, when temporary contracts with private carriers were put into effect. On AACMO's last night of coast-to-coast service on May 7–8, YB-10s were used on four of the six legs from Oakland, California, to Newark to match Rickenbacker and Frye's DC-1 stunt, flying a greater number of miles and making three extra stops in just an hour's more time. Only two additional Army pilots were killed flying the mail after the resumption of operations, on March 30 and April 5.

By May 17 all but one mail route, CAM 9 (Chicago to Fargo, North Dakota), had been restored to civil carriers. AACMO relinquished this last route on June 1, 1934.

Results

In all, 66 major accidents, ten of them with fatalities, resulted in 13 crew deaths, creating an intense public furor. Only five of the 13 deaths actually occurred on flights carrying mail, but directly and indirectly the air mail operation caused accidental crash deaths in the Air Corps to rise by 15% to 54 in 1934, compared to 46 in 1933 and 47 in 1935.

Aircraft employed in carrying the mail were the Curtiss B-2 Condor, Keystone B-4, Keystone B-6, Douglas Y1B-7 and YB-10 bombers; the Boeing P-12 and P-6E fighters; the Curtiss A-12 Shrike; Bellanca C-27C transport; and the Thomas-Morse O-19, Douglas O-25C, O-39, and two models of Douglas O-38 observation aircraft.

Among the 262 Army pilots flying the mail were Ira C. Eaker, Frank A. Armstrong, Elwood R. Quesada, Robert L. Scott, Robert F. Travis, Harold H. George, Beirne Lay Jr., Curtis E. LeMay, and John Waldron Egan, all of whom would play important roles in air operations during the Second World War.

Consequences and effects

Effects on the airline industry
The government had little choice but to return service to the commercial airlines, but did so with several new conditions. The Air Mail Act of June 12, 1934, drafted at the height of the crisis by Black (and known as the "Black-McKellar bill"), restored competitive bidding, closely regulated airmail labor operations, dissolved the holding companies that brought together airlines and aircraft manufacturers, and prevented companies that held the old contracts from obtaining new ones. The new rules were put into effect in March before formal passage of the bill with the announcement that temporary contracts for up to a year would be awarded by Farley. The industry's response, with the tacit consent of the government, was simply to reorganize and change names; for example, Northwest Airways became Northwest Airlines and Eastern Air Transport became Eastern Air Lines. The vertically integrated United Aircraft and Transport Corporation (UATC) appeared to be its particular target and broke up on September 26, 1934, into three companies: United Air Lines Transportation Company, United Aircraft Manufacturing Company, and Boeing Aircraft Company.

Ironically, of the major carriers present at the "Spoils Conference", all received new contracts for their old routes with the exception of United, "the one airline completely innocent of any possible charge of collusion." United's routes were awarded instead to regional independents Braniff Airways and Bowen Air Lines, which managed its routes so badly it soon sold out to Braniff. The biggest winner of the scandal was American, owned by Roosevelt campaign contributor "E. L." Cord, who before he acquired American was owner of a small independent carrier and had not attended the spoils conference. American was United's competitor in Dallas, trying to obtain its Chicago-to-Dallas CAM 3 route, and not only retained its contracts but gained a parallel Chicago-to-New York route, a second route from Chicago-to-Dallas with different intermediate stops, and had its southern transcontinental route shortened to reduce its operating costs.

The most punitive measure was to ban all former airline executives alleged to have colluded from further contracts or working for airlines that obtained one.  United Airlines' president, Philip G. Johnson, chose to leave the United States and helped to form Trans-Canada Airlines. At the age of 52 William Boeing took early retirement as UATC's chairman of the board on September 18 rather than ever deal again with the federal government. Colonel Paul Henderson was compelled to leave his position as National Air Transport's general manager because he had attended the "spoils conferences," this despite offering damaging testimony against Brown to the Black Committee. The effect of the entire scandal was to guarantee that mail-carrying contracts remained unprofitable, and pushed the entire industry towards carrying passengers, which had been Brown's original goal as incentive for developing new technologies, increasing safety, and growth of the American aircraft manufacturing industry.

Throughout the Black Committee process and a smaller, parallel investigation by the Justice Department directed by special prosecutor Carl. L. Ristine, the allegations of corruption by Lewis and Black were never investigated. The original air mail contracts were instead voided on the basis that they were illegally bid, without revealing what evidence was gathered on which that judgment was made and disregarding that most were obtained by the lowest bidder with the rest through statutory provisions of the Air Mail Act of 1930. The Air Mail Act of 1934 repealed those provisions but, with one exception, the carriers charged with illegally securing contracts under them were permitted to reacquire them despite provisions in the new act forbidding it.

With bidding for contracts more competitive and air mail revenue less attractive than before, the airlines placed a new emphasis on passenger transportation and development of modern airliners. Several sued the government for revenues missed while the Air Corps flew the mail. The Black-McKellar bill sought to marginalize the suits by prohibiting the government from doing business with any carrier that filed them, but after severe criticism the provision was dropped from the bill.  On February 4, 1935, almost a year after the contracts were cancelled, the District of Columbia Court of Appeals ruled that the cancellations "amounted to a breach of contract" and a taking of property without due process. The suits went forward, with the last claim settled in 1942. On July 14, 1941, Commissioner Richard H. Akers of the United States Court of Claims found that there had not been any fraud or collusion in the awarding of contracts pursuant to the Air Mail Act of 1930.

Roosevelt also appointed Clark Howell, newspaper editor of the Atlanta Constitution, to chair a five-person committee to investigate all aspects of U.S. civil aviation, resulting in the creation of the Federal Aviation Commission. In severe economic distress, the airlines organized themselves in 1936 into the Air Transport Association of America. Two years later Black-McKellar went the way of McNary-Watres with the passage of the Civil Aeronautics Act, restructuring the airline industry to stress the features championed by Brown in 1930: "government-corporate linkages, limited competition, and restricted entry to the industry."

The Air Line Pilots Association, a union that had publicly supported Roosevelt during the cancellation of the air mail contracts, offered a verdict on the scandal in its history of the union: "The small operators denounced the bidding session of 1930 as a 'spoils conference.' Actually, it was no such thing ... Admittedly, there was an element of ruthlessness in the way (Brown) proceeded, but it was not illegal. Brown succeeded in creating the genesis of a regulated, integrated airline system—a system that FDR would eventually copy. The union of airline pilots was in complete agreement with the policies of Hoover and Brown."

Changes in the Air Corps
At the time of the scandal, the Air Corps was in a new phase of its continuing struggle with the War Department's General Staff for a more independent role for air operations. Technological developments in aircraft design had recently brought about a superiority in all-metal multi-engine aircraft over single-engine fighters, giving weight to their arguments for becoming an autonomous military service equal to the Army and Navy. The Drum Board, chaired by Deputy Army Chief of Staff General Hugh A. Drum, had proposed a compromise in 1933, recommending activation of the General Headquarters (GHQ) Air Force, a centralized organization that had been part of Army mobilization planning since 1924. Subsequently, a pair of bills were proposed in Congress to increase Air Corps autonomy by expanding its size and authorizing it several administrative functions separate from the rest of the Army, both of which the General Staff adamantly opposed.

The immediate results of the operation were disastrous for the image of the Air Corps. Speaker of the House Henry T. Rainey, echoing comments made by Gen. Billy Mitchell, criticized: "If we are unfortunate enough to be drawn into another war, the Air Corps wouldn't amount to much. If it is not equal to carrying the mail, I would like to know what it would do in carrying bombs." Despite the public humiliation, the Air Mail Fiasco resulted in a number of improvements for the Air Corps, bringing about changes that its previous publicity campaigns were unable to obtain.

On April 17, 1934, well before AACMO ended, Secretary Dern convened the "War Department Special Committee on the Army Air Corps," better known as the "Baker Board." Chaired by former Secretary of War Newton D. Baker, the board's announced mission was to examine closely the military air mail operation and the overall condition of the Air Corps.  The Baker Board included all five military members of the earlier Drum Board, four of them senior Army ground force officers who tightly controlled the agenda and scope of the board's investigation to prevent it from becoming a platform for advocating an independent air arm. Of the 12 members, only three were Air Corps advocates.

Not surprisingly, the Baker Board endorsed the earlier findings of the Drum Board, supporting the status quo that the Air Corps was an auxiliary force of the Army and opposing the Air Corps becoming a separate service equal to the Army and Navy. It rejected the threat of air attack as a major threat to the national defense or the need of a large air force to defend against it. It opposed any expansion of the Air Corps until the needs of the Army as a whole had been addressed.  It did however reiterate the Drum Board's recommendation for the immediate activation of the GHQ Air Force, placing under it all air combat units within the continental United States.  This provided another, limited step toward an autonomous air force, but also kept authority divided by maintaining control of supply, doctrine, training and recruitment under the Chief of the Air Corps, and airfields in the control of corps area commanders.

Within the Air Corps, instrument training was upgraded, radio communications were greatly improved into a nationwide system that included navigation aids, and budget appropriations were increased. The Air Corps acquired the first six Link Trainer flight simulators of a fleet that would ultimately number more than 10,000. The operation also demonstrated the complete obsolescence of open-cockpit aircraft in military operations, leading to increased development of modern types in the second half of the decade, most of which served successfully in World War II.

Among the fallout of the scandal was the retirement under fire of Foulois as Chief of the Air Corps. He had been called to testify before the Rogers subcommittee on aviation of the House Committee of Military Affairs during the scandal. Chairman William N. Rogers of New Hampshire was suspicious of Foulois for negotiating aircraft contracts instead of assigning them to the lowest bidder, and during his testimony the Chief of Air Corps had been flamboyant and careless with hyperbole. In the wake of the mail fiasco, Rogers charged him with several violations of law and ethics, including making misleading statements to Congress and mismanagement during the air mail operation. Foulois demanded that Rogers release the evidence against him (largely damning testimony from senior Army staff officers given during secret hearings) and garnered the full support of the normally hostile Secretary of War, George Dern. The matter finally went before the Army's inspector general, whose findings in June 1935 exonerated Foulois of any criminal wrongdoing, but did cite him for making misleading statements regarding the mail operation. He received a reprimand from Dern, but throughout the summer of 1935 was publicly excoriated by Rogers. With his term as Chief expiring in December 1935, he chose to retire concurrently and took terminal leave from the Air Corps, beginning in September.

See also
 Airmails of the United States
 United States government role in civil aviation

Notes
Footnotes

Citations

References
 Borden, Norman E. Jr. (1968). Air Mail Emergency 1934: An Account of 78 Days in the Winter of 1934 When the Army Flew the United States Mail, The Bond Wheelwright Company
 Brady, Tim (2000). The American Aviation Experience: A History, Southern Illinois University Press. 
 Coffey, Thomas M. (1982). Hap: The Story of the U.S. Air Force and the Man Who Built It. New York: The Viking Press. 
 Correll, John L. "The Air Mail Fiasco", AIR FORCE Magazine, March 2008, Vol. 91, No. 3
 Duffy, James P. (2010). Lindbergh vs. Roosevelt: The Rivalry That Divided America. Washington, D.C.:Regnery Publishing. 
 
 Frisbee, John L. "AACMO—Fiasco or Victory?", AIR FORCE Magazine, March 1995, Vol. 78 No. 3
 Glines, Carroll F. "The Airmail Takes Wings", Aerofiles.com. Retrieved 2016-01-04
 Hamilton, Virginia Van der Veer. "Barnstorming the U.S. Mail", American Heritage August 1974; Volume 25, Issue 5, pp. 32–35
 Hopkins, George E. (1982). Flying the Line: The First Half Century of the Air Line Pilots Association. Washington, D.C.:ALPA. 
 Lee, David D. "Senator Black's Investigation of the Airmail, 1933-1934", The Historian Spring 1991; Volume 53, pp. 423–442
 Maurer, Maurer (1987). Aviation in the U.S. Army, 1919–1939, Office of Air Force History, Washington, D.C. 
 Nalty, Bernard C. (1997). Winged Shield, Winged Sword: A History of the United States Air Force, 
 Orenic, Liesl (2009). On the Ground: Labor Struggles in the American Airline Industry. University of Illinois Press. 
 Pelletier, Alain (2010). Boeing: The Complete Story, Haynes Publishing: Sparkford, Somerset, UK 
 Rice, Rondall Ravon (2004). The Politics of Air Power: From Confrontation to Cooperation in Army Aviation Civil-Military Relations, University of Nebraska Press. 
 Russell, David Lee (2013). Eastern Air Lines: A History, 1926-1991, McFarland & Co., Inc. 
 Serling, Robert J., (1976). "The Only Way To Fly". Garden City, New York: Doubleday .
 Shiner, John F. (1983). Foulois and the Army Air Corps 1931-1935, USAF Office of Air Force History, Washington, D.C.
 Tate, Dr. James P. (1998). The Army and Its Air Corps: Army Policy Towards Aviation, 1919–1941, Air University Press, Maxwell AFB, Alabama.
 Van der Linden, F. Robert (2002). Airlines and Air Mail: The Post Office and Birth of the Commercial Aviation Industry. University of Kentucky Press. 
 Werrell, Kenneth P. "'Fiasco' revisited: the Air Corps & the 1934 air mail episode". Air Power History, March 22, 2010. Reproduced by The Free Library
 Winters, Kathleen C. (2010). Amelia Earhart: the Turbulent Life of an American Icon. Palgrave Macmillan. 
 Zuckerman, Michael A. "The Court of Congressional Contempt", Journal of Law and Politics, Winter 2009, reproduced by The Wall Street Journal Law Blog. Retrieved 2016-01-08. 
U.S. Centennial of Flight Commission: Airmail and the Growth of the Airlines
History of United Airlines (Archived 2009-10-24)

Political scandals in the United States
20th-century aviation
20th-century military history of the United States
United States military scandals
United States Postal Service
Airmail
Postal history of the United States
Corporate scandals
Aviation history of the United States